The 23rd Cuban National Series season (1983-84) marked the first time the league was divided into two numbered divisions (each organized into 9 teams), after the first half of the regular season.

Citricultores, from Matanzas Province, became the divisional champions of the 1st Division, with Forestales becoming champions of the 2nd Division.

Standings

First division

Second division

References

 (Note - text is printed in a white font on a white background, depending on browser used.)

Cuban National Series seasons
Base
Base
1984 in baseball